The Mating Season is a 1951 American comedy-drama romance film directed by Mitchell Leisen, and produced by Charles Brackett from a screenplay by Charles Brackett, Richard Breen, and Walter Reisch, based on the play Maggie by Caesar Dunn. The ensemble cast stars Gene Tierney, John Lund, Miriam Hopkins, and Thelma Ritter.

Plot

Ellen McNulty (Thelma Ritter) gives up her hamburger stand in New Jersey when the bank calls in her loan, and goes to visit her son Val (John Lund) in Ohio. Val has recently married a socialite, Maggie (Gene Tierney). To help Maggie put on a dinner party, Val has an employment service send a cook; Ellen arrives first, and Maggie mistakes her for the cook. Ellen, to avoid embarrassing Maggie, does not correct her. After the party, Val follows her home, and persuades her to move in with them.

The next morning, Ellen arrives with her things, and continues the deception, explaining to Val that a mother-in-law in the house would only cause friction. Val reluctantly goes along with the charade.

Maggie's mother (Miriam Hopkins) comes to stay with them. She is a snob, and disapproves of both Val and Ellen.

Maggie and Val later "lend" Ellen to the Kalinger family, owners of the firm where Val works, for a party of their own, whose guests of honor, Mr. and Mrs. Williamson, own a Maryland firm with which the Kalinger firm is about to make a major contract. While tending to Mr. Kalinger (Larry Keating) in his illness, Ellen finds that his son, Kalinger Junior (James Lorimer) – who had previously courted Maggie – is taking credit for Val's research that led to the contract, and she tells Kalinger Senior so.

Kalinger Senior then invites Val and Maggie to the party, forcing Junior to reveal Val's role, which he does graciously. At the party, Maggie is insulted by Mrs. Williamson (Cora Witherspoon) and storms out. Val, realizing that this woman carries a lot of influence, forces Maggie to call the party to apologize. She does so unwillingly, leading to another fight.

The next morning, Val and Maggie make up, agreeing that they were both in the wrong. Later that day, Ellen's friends come to the door and ask to speak to "Mrs. McNulty" - thus revealing to Maggie that Ellen is Val's mother. Maggie is furious with Val for hiding his mother's identity from her. She and her mother leave for a hotel. Maggie later confronts Val at his office. Val tries to explain himself, but Maggie won't listen. She tells him that he has become a snob and that she is moving to Mexico (where divorce was then easier).

Mr. Kalinger decides to get Val and Maggie together. He convinces Maggie to come to the hotel bar with him for a good-bye drink, knowing that Val will be there for a party. When Maggie sees Val, she again scolds him for trying to hide his mother, and leaves the bar. Val leaves the party, and rushes to fetch his mother and bring her back to the party. Maggie, who has come back to the bar, is a witness as Val introduces Ellen to Mrs. Williamson, who was about to hire Val, but wants nothing to do with him when she finds that his mother is neither of her class nor cowed by her. Kalinger Junior also finds Ellen appalling, but Kalinger Senior is delighted, and decides to marry her.

Cast
Gene Tierney as Maggie Carleton McNulty
John Lund as Val McNulty
Miriam Hopkins as Fran Carleton
Thelma Ritter as Ellen McNulty
Jan Sterling as Betsy Donaldson
Larry Keating as George Kalinger, Sr.
James Lorimer as George C. Kalinger, Jr.
Gladys Hurlbut as Natalie Conger
Cora Witherspoon as Mrs. Owen Williamson
Malcolm Keen as Owen Williamson
Ellen Corby as Annie
Billie Bird as Mugsy
Mary Young as Spinster
Samuel Colt as Colonel Conger
Grayce Hampton as Mrs. Fahnstock
William H. Welsh as Mr. Paget 
William Fawcett as Mr. Tuttle
Carol Coombs as Susie

Reception 
A Variety review praised Ritter, "who glitters the brightest" and who "socks with just the right amount of underplaying". The review had positive notes for writer Brackett, director Leisen, and actor Hopkins.

Lionel Collier of Picturegoer deemed it a "bright, but very overlong domestic comedy."

Frank Leyendecker of Boxoffice praised the performances of Ritter and Hopkins and noted, "Director Mitchell Leisen captures attention with the opening shot and maintains a feast pace throughout".

Awards
Won
 Berlin International Film Festival - Bronze Berlin Bear (Comedies)

Nominated
 Academy Award for Best Supporting Actress (Thelma Ritter)

Comic book adaption
 Eastern Color Movie Love #9 (June 1951)

References

External links

Senses of cinema: Mitchell Leisen

1951 films
1950s screwball comedy films
American screwball comedy films
American black-and-white films
American films based on plays
Films directed by Mitchell Leisen
Films produced by Charles Brackett
Films set in Ohio
Paramount Pictures films
Films with screenplays by Charles Brackett
Films adapted into comics
1951 comedy films
1950s English-language films
1950s American films